Uttarahalli Vidhana Sabha seat was one of the seats in Karnataka Legislative Assembly in India. Its electoral size had gradually become one of the biggest in India. It was abolished in 2008 delimitation exercise, and split in smaller segments.

Members of Assembly

Mysore State (Bangalore North constituency)
 1951 (Seat-1): K. V. Byre Gowda, Indian National Congress
 1951 (Seat-2): R. Munisamaiah, Indian National Congress
 1957 (Seat-1): K. V. Byregowda, Indian National Congress
 1957 (Seat-2): Y. Ramakrishna, Indian National Congress

Mysore State (Uttarahalli constituency)
 1962 : J. Srinivasa Reddy, Independent
 1967: Y. Ramakrishna, Independent
 1972: B. Basavalingappa, Indian National Congress

Karnataka State
 1978: M.V. Rajasekharan, Janata Party
 1983: M. Srinivas, Janata Party
 1985: M. Srinivas, Janata Party
 1989: S. Ramesh, Indian National Congress
 1994 : M. Srinivas (Bharatiya Janata Party) 
 1998 (By-Poll) : R. Ashoka (Bharatiya Janata Party)  
 1999 : R. Ashoka (Bharatiya Janata Party)
 2004 : R Ashoka (BJP)
 2008 onwards : constituency abolished. See Padmanabha-nagar and Yeshvanthapura

Election results

1962 Assembly Election
 J. Srinivasa Reddy (IND) : 17,139
 A. V. Narasimha Reddy (INC) : 14,881

1994 Assembly Election
 Srinivas M. (BJP) : 144,193 
 Ramesh S. (INC) : 98,315

1997 Bye-poll
 R. Ashoka (BJP) : 111,920
 Ramesh S. (INC) : 91946

1999 Assembly Election
 R Ashoka (BJP) : 230,914 votes  
 S Ramesh (INC) : 207,009

2004 Assembly Election
 R Ashoka (BJP) : 313,309 votes   
 Somashekar S T (INC) : 229,308   (This was one of the biggest assembly segments in India, which is why candidates were getting so many votes)

See also 
 List of constituencies of Karnataka Legislative Assembly

References 

Former assembly constituencies of Karnataka
Bangalore Urban district